, also known as 5-Tōbun no Hanayome, is a romantic comedy manga series written and illustrated by Negi Haruba. It began serialization in Kodansha's Weekly Shōnen Magazine on August 9, 2017, and was published digitally in English by Kodansha USA under their Kodansha Comics imprint from June 26, 2018 to August 11, 2020. The physical release began on December 31, 2018. The story is told through flashbacks from the wedding day of Futaro and one of the quintuplets to their time as tutor and students.

Main series

Character books

Notes

References

External links

  
  at Kodansha Comics 
 

Lists of manga volumes and chapters